George Turner (born 9 August 1940) is a Labour Party politician in the United Kingdom.

Early life
Turner went to Laxton Grammar School (now part of Oundle School) on North Street in Oundle. At Imperial College London he gained a BSc in Physics, then obtained a PhD in Physics from Gonville and Caius College, Cambridge. He then became Head of the Electrical Engineering Department at the University of East Anglia.

Parliamentary career
Turner contested North West Norfolk in 1992, but failed to be elected. He was returned as the Member of Parliament (MP) for the constituency in 1997, but lost his seat back to Henry Bellingham of the Conservatives – whom he had first defeated – in 2001.

In the House of Lords on 25 April 2012 it was asserted by Turner (Col 1786), "Lord Lexden: My Lords, would my noble friend think of reminding Mr Henry Bellingham that he has already experienced the Perceval family's taste for revenge, having been deprived of his Commons seat at the 1997 election by a direct descendant of the assassinated Prime Minister?". The descendant in question was a third candidate in the constituency, who in Lexden's view had deprived Bellingham of a critical number of votes in the election, thereby delivering victory to George Turner.

Personal life
He married Lesley Duggan. They have two daughter and a stepson.

References

External links
 They Work For You
 Ask Aristotle
 

Labour Party (UK) MPs for English constituencies
1940 births
Living people
UK MPs 1997–2001
People from Oundle
Alumni of Imperial College London
Alumni of Gonville and Caius College, Cambridge
Academics of the University of East Anglia
English physicists